J. Davis Powell House is a historic home located at Columbia, South Carolina. It was built in 1919–1920, and is a two-story, irregular plan, yellow brick, Prairie Style dwelling believed to be designed by Floyd A. Dernier (1879-1934).  It has a broad, low-pitched, hipped roof and sets of elongated, repeated windows on both floors.  Also on the property are the contributing garage (c. 1920) with a second story addition (c. 1940); a pool house (c. 1920) and pool (c. 1935); four cast stone classical columns (c. 1920); a goldfish pond or pool (c. 1920); and an outdoor fireplace (c. 1922).

It was added to the National Register of Historic Places in 2012.

References

Houses on the National Register of Historic Places in South Carolina
Prairie School architecture in South Carolina
Houses completed in 1920
Houses in Columbia, South Carolina
National Register of Historic Places in Columbia, South Carolina